The Shire of Wambo was a local government area in the Darling Downs region of Queensland, Australia. The shire surrounded but did not include the town of Dalby – which had its own municipal government.

History

Wambo Division was created on 11 November 1879 as one of 74 divisions around Queensland under the Divisional Boards Act 1879 with a population of 1018.

On 23 February 1882, there was a realignment of boundaries between Wambo Division and Barambah Division, involving subdivision 3 of Wambo Division and subdivisions 1 and 2 of Barambah Division.

With the passage of the Local Authorities Act 1902, Wambo Division became the Shire of Wambo on 31 March 1903.

On 15 March 2008, under the Local Government (Reform Implementation) Act 2007 passed by the Parliament of Queensland on 10 August 2007, the Shire of Wambo merged with the Town of Dalby and the Shires of Chinchilla, Murilla and Tara and Division 2 of the Shire of Taroom (the Wandoan area) to form the Western Downs Region.

Towns and localities
The Shire of Wambo included the following settlements:

Towns:
 Bell
 Jandowae
 Jimbour
 Kaimkillenbun
 Warra

Localities:
 Cooranga
 Ducklo
 Irvingdale
 Jinghi
 Kogan
 Kumbarilla
 Macalister
 Moola

 Mowbullan
 Nandi
 Pirrinuan
 Rangemore
 Ranges Bridge
 St. Ruth
 Tuckerang

Chairmen
 1927: Richard Henry Francis Best junior
Robert Sparkes

Population

References

External links
 

Former local government areas of Queensland
Darling Downs
2008 disestablishments in Australia
Populated places disestablished in 2008
1879 establishments in Australia